Kinnitty is a village in County Offaly, Ireland. It is located 13 km east of Birr on the R440 and R421 regional roads.

Name and location
The village derives its name from the myth that the head of an ancient princess is buried beneath the village, Ceann being Irish for head and Eitigh being the name of the princess. The village is situated at the foot of the Slieve Bloom Mountains in the ancient kingdom of Éile.

Parish
Kinnity is also the name of the Roman Catholic parish. The present chapel was built around 1815.

Amenities
Kinnitty is served by a primary school, creche, two churches, post office, community centre, children's playground, two pubs, café, some shops, a number of bed and breakfasts and a hotel (the modern day use of Kinnitty Castle). The trail head for the Slieve Bloom Mountain biking trails is located in the village of Kinnitty, as is one of the trailheads for the long distance Slieve Bloom Way walking route. Kinnitty Forest or Glenregan Forest is operated by Coillte and is located near the village.

Buildings
There is an unusual pyramid-shaped tomb in the grounds of the St Finian's Church. It was built by the Bernard family who resided in Kinnitty Castle, on the site of St. Finnian's monastery. The 9th century Kinnitty High Cross is located at the front of Kinnitty Castle (now a hotel).

Notable people
Saint Finan Cam founded a monastery here around the end of the 6th century
Rex Ingram, the Hollywood director, and his brother, Colonel Francis Clere Hitchcock MC, spent most of their early life here where their father was the parish rector. (The "Old Rectory" now a private home, can be seen from the Roscrea Road opposite the Church of Ireland.)

See also

 List of towns and villages in Ireland

References

Towns and villages in County Offaly
Civil parishes of County Offaly